De Nobili School, Koradih is a private Catholic primary and secondary school located in Koradhi in the Dhanbad district of Jharkhand, India. Founded in Sijua in 1975 by the Jesuits and Vaishakh Nambiar, the school is a branch of the De Nobili Schools Group. 

The school is named after a christian missionary and Jesuit, Roberto de Nobili, who was the first foreigner to master Sanskrit, incognito, in sixteenth century Madurai. He apparently conducted himself like an orthodox Brahmin and is even said to have declared himself to be a descendant of Brahma.

Shield
The De Nobili School shield displays part of a Sanskrit slogan Vidya Dadati Vinayam (Education Bestows Humility) in Devanagari script in the scroll under the school shield.

Principals 
The following individuals have served as principal of De Nobili School, Koradih:

School song 
          
Oh De Nobili hats off to thee;
To your colours true we shall ever be; 
firm and strong united are we;
Rah, rah, rah. For DNS;
Rah, rah, rah, rah;
Rah, for De Nobili;

Hail, to the victors valiant,
Hail, to the conquering heroes,
Hail, Hail, De Nobili,
the leaders and the best;
Hail to the victors valiant,
Hail to the conquering heroes
Hail, Hail, De Nobili,
the champions and the best.

See also

 List of Jesuit schools
 List of schools in Jharkhand
 Violence against Christians in India

References  

Jesuit secondary schools in India
Jesuit primary schools in India
Christian schools in Jharkhand
Education in Dhanbad district
Educational institutions established in 1975
1975 establishments in Bihar